The 2022–23 Tainan TSG GhostHawks season was the franchise's 2nd season, its second season in the T1 League, its 2nd in Tainan City. On July 6, 2022, the GhostHawks promoted Liu Meng-Chu, the interim head coach of the Tainan TSG GhostHawks, as their new head coach. On March 3, 2023, the GhostHawks named Ma I-Hung, the assistant coach of the Tainan TSG GhostHawks, as their interim head coach for one game since Liu Meng-Chu coached UCH basketball team for University Basketball Association (UBA) 2022–23 season quarterfinals series.

Draft 

 Reference：

The fifth place, Taoyuan Leopards, and the sixth place, Tainan TSG GhostHawks, in the 2021–22 season acquired two selections in the first round.

Standings

Roster 

<noinclude>

Game log

MaGung Food Invitational Game

2022 Interleague Play 
On September 16, 2022, Tainan TSG GhostHawks announced that Huang Hsuan joined to the team as the player in these invitational games.

Group match

Quarterfinals

Semifinals

Match of the third place

Preseason 
Akeme Smart joined to the team as the testing player in these preseason games.

Regular season

Player Statistics 
<noinclude>

Regular season

 Reference：

Transactions 
On February 1, 2023, Tainan TSG GhostHawks cancelled the registration of Lu Chi-Erh's playership. On February 23, 2023, Tainan TSG GhostHawks cancelled the registration of Lung Hung-Yuan's playership.

Free agents

Additions

Subtractions

Awards

Import of the Month

All-Star Game Awards

References 

2022–23 T1 League season by team
Tainan TSG GhostHawks seasons